The second USS Monadnock was an iron-hulled, twin-screw, double-turreted monitor of the  in the United States Navy which saw service in the Spanish–American War.

On June 23, 1874, in response to the Virginius Incident, President Ulysses S. Grant's Secretary of Navy George M. Robeson  ordered the Monadnock laid down (scrapped and reconstructed) contracted by Phineas Burgess at the Continental Iron Works, Vallejo, California; launched 19 September 1883; completed at Mare Island Navy Yard; and commissioned there 20 February 1896, Captain George W. Sumner in command, Lt. Cdr. Edward D. Taussig, executive officer.

Service history

After fitting out Monadnock served as a unit of the Pacific Squadron along the west coast. During the next two years exercises and training cruises sent her along the Pacific coast from Puget Sound to the Baja California peninsula. After the outbreak of war with Spain, she was ordered to join George Dewey's fleet in the Philippines. She departed San Francisco, California, on 23 June 1898, touched at Hawaii early in July, and reached Manila Bay on 16 August.

On February 10, 1899, several reports indicate the Monadnock participated in the Battle of Caloocan, a town a few miles north of Manila. She also participated in other fighting, such as late February shelling of a city.

She operated on blockade duty in the Mariveles-Manila-Cavite area, with brief voyages to Hong Kong, until December 1899.

On 26 December she sailed for Hong Kong, and for the next five years cruised the rivers of China, particularly the Yangtze, and along her coast to protect American interests. Between 27 January and 7 October 1901, she stood almost continuous duty at the mouth of the Yangtze protecting the foreign settlement at Shanghai, operating similarly on three further occasions: 6 December 1902 to 8 April 1903; 18 September 1903 to 10 March 1904; and 8 April 1904 to 28 November 1904.

On 3 February 1905 she returned to Cavite. Operating out of Olongapo, she remained in the Philippines, with two interruptions for brief visits to Hong Kong, until decommissioned at Cavite on 10 March 1909.

Recommissioned in reserve 20 April 1911, she resumed operations out of Olongapo, until placed in full commission 31 January 1912 at Cavite. For the next seven years she cruised with submarines, and towed targets. Decommissioning for the last time 24 March 1919, her name was struck off the Navy list on 2 February 1923, and her hull was sold, on the Asiatic Station, 24 August 1923.

Awards
 Spanish Campaign Medal
 Philippine Campaign Medal
 China Relief Expedition Medal
 World War I Victory Medal

References
 

 

Amphitrite-class monitors
Ships built in Vallejo, California
1883 ships
Spanish–American War monitors of the United States
Philippine–American War ships of the United States
World War I monitors of the United States